Zahir al-Ghafri (Arabic: زاهر الغافري) (b. 1956) is a poet from the Sultanate of Oman. Born in Zanzibar, al-Ghafri is affiliated with the University of Mohammed V, Rabat, department of philosophy and has published 12 collections of poetry. Some of his work has been translated into Spanish, Chinese, and other languages. In 2008, he was awarded the Kika Poetry Prize for his poem "Stranger Between Two Rivers".

Career 
Al-Ghafri is a national poet, Omani Al-Manbit. Some of his work has been translated into Spanish, English, German, Swedish, Persian, Hindi, and Chinese.  Some of his works include "Ignorant Poetry", "Pleasure and Benefit", and "Classical Poetry". He first traveled to Baghdad in 1968. In his travels, Al-Ghafri developed a worldly poetic style anchored by a consistent nostalgia for Oman. Al-Ghafri is the head of the Omani magazine Al-Burwaz, which is concerned with the visual arts. He is also reported to have interests in vanguard cinema and the plastic arts.

Poetry 

 (1983), White Shades: Paris
 (1991), silence comes to recognition: Cologne
 (1993), Isolation from Night: Muscat
 (2000), flowers in a well: Camel Publications House, Cologne
 (2006), Shades of Water Color: Range Printing, Publishing and Distribution House
 (2008), whenever an angel appears in the castle: Arab Proliferation Foundation
 (2013), five groups: Nineveh Study, Publishing and Distribution House
 (2017), One Life and Many Stairs: Publication and distribution endeavor
 (2018), in every well land you dream of the garden: Oman Press, Publishing and Distribution Foundation
 (2020), bedroom: Pilot Publishing Circuit

Awards 

He won the Kika Poetry Prize for his poem "Stranger Between Two Rivers" in 2008.

References 

Omani poets
21st-century Arabic poets
1956 births
Living people